The javelin frog (Litoria microbelos) is a species of frog in the subfamily Pelodryadinae, that is endemic to Australia. Its natural habitats are subtropical or tropical dry lowland grassland, swamps, and intermittent freshwater marshes.

Description

The javelin frog is the smallest known tree frog in Australia, with males reaching  and females  in length. Colours are typically brown with a light-brown dorsal surface, dark-brown lateral stripes and light, almost white, ventral surface. A white stripe runs along the lip and along the side of the frog.

References

Litoria
Amphibians of Western Australia
Amphibians of the Northern Territory
Amphibians of Queensland
Taxonomy articles created by Polbot
Amphibians described in 1966
Frogs of Australia